Bernardetia is a bacterial genus from the family Bernardetiaceae with on known species (Bernardetia litoralis). Flexibacter litoralis has been reclassified to Bernardetia litoralis.

References

Cytophagia
Bacteria genera
Monotypic bacteria genera
Taxa described in 2017